Molodyozhny is a rural locality (a settlement) in Krasnopolyanskoye Rural Settlement, Nikolsky District, Vologda Oblast, Russia. The population was 161 as of 2010.

Geography 
Molodyozhny is located 22 km west of Nikolsk (the district's administrative centre) by road. Krasnoye Zvedeniye is the nearest rural locality.

References 

Rural localities in Nikolsky District, Vologda Oblast